GTunnel is a Windows application developed by Garden Networks which sets up a local HTTP or SOCKS proxy server which tunnels traffic through their server farm before it reaches its intended destination.

Features 
GTunnel protects Internet users' privacy and freedom of speech in these ways: 
User's IP address is hidden and user's Internet privacy protected. The destination servers see GTunnel server addresses instead.
Traffic content is encrypted with industry-strength algorithms between the user's PC and GTunnel servers so the local filtering/censorship systems will not see the content in clear-text format.

GTunnel version 1.1 provides a standard mode, which is the main working mode and provides the best data transfer performance by connecting to the back-end servers directly, a Skype mode, and a Tor mode that go through computers in these P2P network. GTunnel also has an improved user interface which features real-time traffic graphs.

GTunnel replaces the earlier Garden and G2 client software and becomes the main client software of Garden Networks.

GTunnel works on Linux through Wine support.

A Diagram of GTunnel's Working Modes

See also 
 Garden Networks
 Freegate
 Ultrasurf

References

External links 
 http://gardennetworks.org/download
Download latest version of GTunnel from TechSpot.com


Internet censorship in China
Proxy servers
Anonymity networks
Internet privacy software
Windows Internet software